"American Country Love Song" is a song recorded by American country music artist Jake Owen. It is the first single from his fifth studio album for RCA Nashville, American Love. The song was written by Ross Copperman, Jaren Johnston and Ashley Gorley, with the former producing it with Shane McAnally. The track acts as a celebration for the various kinds of love being made in America.

"American Country Love Song" gave Owen his sixth number-one country hit on the Billboard Country Airplay chart. It also reached numbers six and 55 on both the Hot Country Songs and Hot 100 charts respectively. The single was certified Gold by the Recording Industry Association of America (RIAA), and has sold 351,000 units in the United States as of September 2016. It achieved similar chart success in Canada, peaking at number two on the Country chart and number 88 on the Canadian Hot 100. It garnered a Platinum certification from Music Canada, denoting sales of 80,000 units in that country.

The accompanying music video for the song was directed by Jeff Venable and features Owen taking a road trip on the southern United States highways.

Content
The song is a list that "celebrates quintessential ideas of love". In the verses, Owen "speak-sings" in a manner that The Boot compared to Shawn Mullins' "Lullaby", while the "anthemic chorus" features steel guitar and a "drum-heavy arrangement".

Owen told Nash Country Weekly magazine that "“I think my fans have come to expect a certain kind of music from me; songs that are fun, energetic and just make you feel good. ‘American Country Love Song’ has the feeling of freedom and being young and adventurous...The single is a broad-spectrum glance in a three-minute song that describes a couple of kids living that American country love song...[b]ut, it's also a much larger celebration of the love story that is America itself, from cowboys and cowgirls to cheerleaders and quarterbacks in small towns and big cities."

Reception

Critical reception
An uncredited review from Taste of Country was favorable, saying that Owen's "storytelling has become more nuanced" while praising the production and lyrics.

Commercial
The song debuted at number 33 on Country Airplay for chart dated March 19, 2016, and debuted at number 18 on the Hot Country Songs the following week. On that same week, it debuted at number 83 on the Hot 100 chart before leaving the next week. It reappeared on the week of June 18 at number 89, and peaked at number 55 the week of September 17, remaining on the chart for seventeen weeks. The song was certified gold by the Recording Industry Association of America (RIAA) on August 6, 2016 and has sold 351,000 copies in the United States as of September 2016.

In Canada, the song debuted at number 99 on the Canadian Hot 100 chart dated July 30, 2016 but left the next week. It made a reappearance on the week of August 13 at number 90 and reached number 88 the week after, staying on the chart for eight weeks. The song received a platinum certification from Music Canada on September 19, 2017.

Music video
The music video was directed by Jeff Venable and premiered in April 2016. The video shows Owen driving the southern United States highways in a 1960s light green Volkswagen Microbus, meeting with fans along the way and making pit stops that involve fireworks, eateries and attractions in states like Chattanooga and Owen's hometown of Vero Beach, Florida.

Live performances
On August 1, 2016, Owen first performed the song live on ABC's Good Morning America. He performed it again on Jimmy Kimmel Live! on September 21.

Charts and certifications

Charts

Year end charts

Certifications

See also
List of number-one country singles of 2016 (U.S.)

References

2016 songs
2016 singles
Jake Owen songs
RCA Records Nashville singles
Songs written by Ross Copperman
Songs written by Ashley Gorley
Songs written by Jaren Johnston
Song recordings produced by Shane McAnally
Song recordings produced by Ross Copperman